Steve Lazarides (born c. 1969) is a British-Greek Cypriot publisher, photographer, collector and curator. He has helped popularise street art and underground art.

Early life
Steve Lazarides grew up in Bristol, England and studied photography at Newcastle Polytechnic. He discovered street subculture and graffiti art as a teenager at Bristol's Barton Hill neighbourhood youth club, organised by John Nation and referenced in 2020 documentary Banksy and the Rise of Outlaw Art.

Art career
In the 1980s, he started out with a Nikon F-mount camera documenting his surrounding environments as a photography student. He subsequently worked as a photographer for Sleazenation, where he was employed as photography director from 1996 till 2001, and The Face. Lazarides documented British sub-cultures and youth movements such as the UK rave scene in the early 1990s; skate culture and the rise of outsider street art.

Commissioned by Sleazenation to photograph Banksy's portrait in 1997, he continued to work with the artist, including as the anonymous artist's driver and photographer, before eventually becoming his gallerist.

Lazarides and Banksy also launched the 'Pictures on Walls' website in 2001 to promote graffiti art, and widened their scope to work with a larger roster of street artists. He created an in-house print studio, Lazarides Editions, and worked with the artists to create prints to share with the art community. The market in street art became commercially successful in 2007 only shortly before the 2008 recession, with Banksy's work, "Laugh Now", selling for £228,000 at auction in early 2008. Andrew Child wrote in the Financial Times, "If there had been one individual responsible for whipping up and sustaining the fever around urban art, and who stood to lose most from its demise, it was Steve Lazarides.".

Lazarides opened up his first gallery in London in 2006, and brought many unknown artists in the UK to light including holding Invader's first UK exhibition, Space Invader's Invasion London and Rubik Bad Men II. Lazarides now represents the portrait painter Jonathan Yeo, the Parisian artist JR, the contemporary English painter Antony Micallef and Portuguese graffiti/street artist Vhils.

In 2009 he moved headquarters from Charing Cross Road into a five-story Georgian townhouse on Rathbone Place, near Oxford Street, with the first exhibition at the new Lazarides Rathbone being of the Portuguese graffiti artist Vhils, which was also the artist's debut UK show. Lazarides Rathbone formed the flagship Lazarides space with Lazarides Editions creating prints in a separate site (situated in Greenwich). In 2016 Lazarides opened Banksy Print Gallery in the Mondrian Hotel on the South Bank. The space centered around Lazarides' time with Banksy and also sold secondary-market Banksy prints. In early 2018 Lazarides moved the space to Mayfair.

Lazarides left the business in September 2019.

Post-Banksy
Lazarides and Banksy parted ways in 2008, in unexplained circumstances."

Lazarides began to organise shows that "would not look out of place on a Turner Prize shortlist". He pioneered the contemporary 'immersive art' trend with several 'pop-up' shows, including Hell's Half Acre in October 2010, co-curated with actor Kevin Spacey and held in The Old Vic Tunnels beneath Waterloo station, London. He returned to the tunnels in 2011 and 2012, with shows titled Minotaur and Bedlam. He held an off-site exhibition in collaboration with The Vinyl Factory in October 2013, titled BRUTAL and taking place at London's 180 The Strand. These pop-up shows have included work by Doug Foster, Conor Harrington, Lucy McLauchlan, Antony Micallef, Karim Zeriahen, Stanley Donwood, Vhils, Todd James and Ian Francis.

Banksy Captured Volumes One and Two 
In 2016, Lazarides began curating his personal photography archive of 100,000 images containing roughly 12,000 photographs he took whilst documenting the career of Banksy, and self-published them as two books, Banksy Captured Volume I & Volume II. Lazarides self-distributed the first and second editions of the two volumes, resulting in sales of over 5,000 copies within a month, at the end of 2019. Banksy Captured Volume II, features further photography and commentary, and was published in March 2021. Volume Two includes reportage from Banksy's 2006 Los Angeles exhibition "Barely Legal", images of the artist's unauthorised installation inside London's Natural History Museum during 2004. Banksy Captured Volume I & Volume II were both self-published via Lazarides' Laz Emporium venture.

In 2020 Lazarides appeared as a talking head in Vision Films' documentary Banksy and the Rise of Outlaw Art.

Laz Emporium 
Lazarides' current venture is Laz Emporium, selling art prints and homeware using designs from artists including Jamie Hewlett, Jonathan Yeo, Mode 2, Charming Baker, Stash, Teech DDS, and Lazarides' own photography. It includes an online store and a shop across two floors in Soho, London, with a downstairs exhibition space. The items are all made at Lazarides' art, design and craft studio in the West Country.

References

External links
 Banksy Captured
 Steve Lazarides Instagram

Living people
Art dealers from London
1969 births
Artists from Bristol